"I'll See You in Court" is the tenth episode of the third season of the American comedy television series Married... with Children, and the 45th episode of the series overall. In the episode, the Bundys attempt (at Marcy Rhoades's suggestion) to improve their love life by having marital relations in a different setting. While staying at the Hop-On-Inn, the Bundys discover a secretly recorded video tape of the Rhoades having sex. Despite this, the Bundys decide to have sex and end up having themselves recorded as well. The two families then proceed to sue the establishment for violation of their privacy.

Conflict erupted between the show's producers and the Fox network over the episode's content, which prevented the episode from being aired in the United States until June 2002, five years after Married... with Childrens initial television run ended in 1997. Even when first shown on American television in 2002, four lines were removed from the broadcast, despite it having already run uncut in other countries.

Plot
After writing to a televised sex-help program, Peggy decides that the best way to rekindle her relationship with Al is to have sex in a different location. Upon Marcy's recommendation, Peggy and Al go to the Hop-On-Inn and discover a videotape waiting for them in their room. After watching some of the tape, the Bundys realize that the couple having sex on the video are Steve and Marcy. Although Al is disgusted, the action turns Peggy on and the couple have sex.

Peggy and Al return home and show the tape to Steve and Marcy, who are embarrassed by the film, much to the delight of the Bundys. The Rhoades express their dismay that they were secretly recorded, but Steve points out that the Bundys may have been videotaped as well. Marcy and Al are upset by this violation of their privacy and propose physical violence against the owners of the motel. Steve and Peg, on the other hand, want to take action against the Hop-On-Inn and make money from the incident.

Peggy convinces Al to sue the motel with her and the Rhoades. Steve, not wanting a lawyer to take any of the million dollars he expects to win from the case, decides to act as one for the two families. The case begins with Steve presenting a lengthy opening statement, during which the stenographer and the judge fall asleep. Next, Steve shows the subpoenaed sex tapes from the motel, despite objections from his wife. After a few hours, the tape runs out and the courtroom applauds Steve and Marcy's romp. Next, Steve shows Peggy and Al's tape, which ends after a few seconds.

After the plaintiff rests, the defense lawyer calls Marcy, Al, and Peggy to the stand. She asks Marcy a series of embarrassing questions, hoping to prove Marcy knew that the camera was there. Her tactic with the Bundys is to try to prove sexual intercourse did not occur on the videotape. In the end, the Rhoades are awarded $10,000 but the Bundys receive nothing, because the jury does not believe that sex occurred. After everyone exits the courtroom, Al attempts to prove that he can perform when he wants to and has sex with Peggy for hours on the judge's bench, unwittingly while being recorded by the courtroom camera.

Production and controversy
The episode was written by Jeanne Baruch and Jeanne Romano, both newcomers to Married... with Children. Directed by Gerry Cohen, it was taped on January 6, 1989, with a planned airing date of February 19 of the same year, but the censors of the Fox Broadcasting Company objected to many of the lines in the episode. It was not the first time that Fox censors had struggled with the content in Married... with Children. Earlier in the season, producers and writers Michael G. Moye and Ron Leavitt had to fight with the censors to air "The Camping Show", an episode where the Bundys and the Rhoades are trapped in a cabin in the wilderness as all three women have their periods at the same time. It was intended to be shown in November 1988, but its airing was delayed while the network wrangled with the subject. The episode aired on December 11, 1988, but the producers were forced to change the title from "A Period Piece" to "The Camping Show", despite the fact that the title itself does not appear onscreen and is not mentioned during the program.

The censors ended up pulling "I'll See You in Court", preventing it from airing in the United States during the series' original run. Terry Rakolta, a political activist from Bloomfield Hills, Michigan, had launched a letter-writing campaign against the program after viewing the Season 3 episode "Her Cups Runneth Over" in January 1989. Offended by the episode's content, she urged advertisers to boycott the show, several of whom did or pledged to more carefully screen the episodes for which they provided advertising. The campaign garnered more media attention than she had expected and the advertisers' more careful scrutiny of the individual episodes that they supported was a significant factor that led to the pulling of "I'll See You in Court".  Contributing to this was that the overall topic, sex, was not seen as a topic to be vocally and openly discussed on television.

In an interview with Playboy magazine, Moye claimed that the producers dubbed the episode the "Lost Episode" both because it never aired and because they felt that they lost control of the project. A typical episode of Married... with Children contained two or three censor notes denoting content that was "too graphic" or "over the edge", whereas "I'll See You in Court" contained a total of 15. After arguing with the censors and conceding all but four of the notes, Fox still refused to air the episode. Moye claims that the final total of 13 changes was unacceptable because "[t]he integrity of the show was shot to hell".

The episode did premiere in other parts of the world in 1990. On June 18, 2002, the FX network broadcast the episode for the first time on American television. It was still not shown in its entirety, however, as the network cut four lines, less than one minute, during the scene where the two families decide on what to do about the videotapes:

Although the episode has aired in Australia (in a later-than-normal time), New Zealand, Europe, and Canada unedited, the above omissions mean that it has never been broadcast in the United States in its entirety. The total time between when the episode was taped and when it premiered in the United States was 13 years, 5 months, and 12 days.

Reception
The episode remained unaired for so long in the United States that contemporary critics did not have an opportunity to review it. After the 2002 airing, the episode became available in the United States on the Married with Children, Vol. 1 – The Most Outrageous Episodes DVD, which was released on February 4, 2003, and The Complete Third Season, which was released on January 25, 2005. DVD Verdict claimed that the content of the show was not overly racy, even by the standards of the era. The review claims that, by 2003, the content was "so sedate as to be comatose." Film Freak Central gave the episode a grade of C+, calling the episode "quaint" and warning to "[n]ever trust the hype."

References

External links

1989 American television episodes
Censored works
Censorship of broadcasting in the United States
Unaired television episodes
Married... with Children
Publisher censorship
Television controversies in the United States
Television episodes set in Chicago
Television episodes pulled from general rotation
Television episodes about dysfunctional families